The Starr Mill Road Bridge is a historic bridge in Middletown, Connecticut.  It is a single span Warren through truss bridge, spanning the Coginchaug River near the Starr Mill complex on the west bank of the river.  Built in 1927 by the Berlin Construction Company, it is one of a shrinking number of period metal truss bridges in the state.  The bridge was listed on the National Register of Historic Places in 1993.  It is closed to all forms of passage.

Description and history
The Starr Mill Road Bridge is located in western Middletown, spanning the Coginchaug River just below (east of) the Starr Mill dam. It is accessible via Middlefield Road (Connecticut Route 157) on the south, and Beverly Heights, the mill access road, on the north. The bridge deck and structure are in deteriorating condition.

The bridge was built by the city in 1927, as a part of a bridge-building program in the outer portions of the city.  The bridge was constructed by the Berlin Construction Company, one of Connecticut's leading bridge makers of the early 20th century.  The company was created by principals of the Berlin Iron Bridge Company after that company was merged into the American Bridge Company, and continued to be a major regional supplier of bridge trusses until they were broadly supplanted in road engineering practices by steel girder bridges.  The bridge has an unusual combination of riveted and bolted joints, an indication of the difficulty of performing riveting in the field.

See also
 National Register of Historic Places listings in Middlesex County, Connecticut
 List of bridges on the National Register of Historic Places in Connecticut

References

External links
 Starr Mill Road Bridge

Road bridges on the National Register of Historic Places in Connecticut
Buildings and structures in Middletown, Connecticut
Bridges completed in 1927
Bridges in Middlesex County, Connecticut
National Register of Historic Places in Middlesex County, Connecticut
Warren truss bridges in the United States
1927 establishments in Connecticut